Kenneth Tautohe Going (18 February 1942 – 6 August 2008) was a New Zealand rugby union player. A full-back, Going represented North Auckland at a provincial level, and was a member of the New Zealand national side, the All Blacks, on the 1974 tour of Ireland. He played three matches for the All Blacks but did not play any internationals. Of Ngāti Hine and Ngāpuhi descent, Going played 24 matches for New Zealand Māori.

References

1942 births
2008 deaths
People educated at the Church College of New Zealand
New Zealand rugby union players
Māori All Blacks players
New Zealand international rugby union players
Ngāti Hine people
Ngāpuhi people
Northland rugby union players
Rugby union fullbacks
Rugby union players from the Northland Region